Bangsjøan is a man-made lake on the borders of the municipalities of Snåsa, Grong, Overhalla, and Steinkjer in Trøndelag county, Norway. The lake was created by the building of a dam which cause the water level of three lakes to rise and flow together into one large lake. The dam is located on what is now the northwestern side of the lake.

Originally, there were three lakes. The southwestern lake was called Ytter-Bangsjøen, the middle lake was Midter-Bangsjøen, and the northeastern lake was Øyster-Bangsjøen. Today, the lakes flow together and the three old lake names are still used to refer to their respective areas in the large lake. The lake empties through a dam at the northwestern end and into the river Bongna.

See also
List of lakes in Norway

References

Steinkjer
Snåsa
Grong
Overhalla
Lakes of Trøndelag
Reservoirs in Norway